

Rudolf Ehrenberger (25 August 1915 – 8 March 1944) was a German Luftwaffe ace and recipient of the Knight's Cross of the Iron Cross during World War II.  Ehrenberger was killed on 8 March 1944 near Wittenberge, Nazi Germany.  He was posthumously awarded the Knight's Cross on 6 April 1944.  During his career he was credited with 49 aerial victories.

Awards

 Ehrenpokal der Luftwaffe on 19 October 1941 as Feldwebel and pilot
 German Cross in Gold on 9 September 1942 as Oberfeldwebel in the I./Jagdgeschwader 53
 Knight's Cross of the Iron Cross on 6 April 1944 as Oberfeldwebel and Flugzeugführer (pilot) in the 6./Jagdgeschwader 53

References

Citations

Bibliography

 
 
 

1915 births
1944 deaths
Luftwaffe pilots
German World War II flying aces
Recipients of the Gold German Cross
Recipients of the Knight's Cross of the Iron Cross
Luftwaffe personnel killed in World War II
People from Mistelbach
Aviators killed by being shot down